Park Wood is an  biological Site of Special Scientific Interest east of Brinkley in Cambridgeshire.

This is woodland of the wet ash/maple type, a scarce and declining habitat. Ground flora include bluebell, dog’s mercury and oxlip, and there are indicators of ancient woodland such as herb-paris and butterfly-orchid.

The site is private land with no public access.

References

Sites of Special Scientific Interest in Cambridgeshire